David Stearns (born February 18, 1985) is an American baseball executive who most recently served as the president of baseball operations for the Milwaukee Brewers of Major League Baseball (MLB). Stearns currently holds an advisory role with the team. Stearns previously served as the assistant general manager of MLB's Houston Astros, worked for the Office of the Commissioner of Baseball, the Arizona Fall League, and in the baseball operations departments for the Cleveland Indians and New York Mets.

Early career
Stearns graduated from Harvard University with a degree in political science in 2007. While he attended Harvard, he was a sports writer for The Harvard Crimson and interned with the Pittsburgh Pirates of Major League Baseball (MLB).

After graduating from Harvard, Stearns worked for the baseball operations departments for the New York Mets and the Arizona Fall League. He joined the MLB Central Office in 2008, where he worked on the negotiating team for MLB's collective bargaining agreement. He spent his last 13 months in the central office as manager of labor relations, where he aided teams going through the process of salary arbitration. In December 2011, the Cleveland Indians hired Stearns and Derek Falvey as their co-directors of baseball operations, with Stearns focusing on player contracts, data analysis, and strategy, and Falvey working on player acquisitions. In November 2012, the Houston Astros, who had lost over 100 games in both of the past two seasons, hired Stearns as assistant general manager, second only to Jeff Luhnow, the general manager. While many organizations have multiple assistant general managers, the Astros employed only Stearns in the role.

When talking about August 2015, Luhnow said of his staff: “There’s several people in our organization that have GM potential, and David’s one of them." At that time, the Milwaukee Brewers began searching for a new general manager, prioritizing youth and experience with data analytics, which the Astros used in their rebuild.

Milwaukee Brewers
On September 21, 2015, the Milwaukee Brewers named Stearns their next general manager, succeeding Doug Melvin, who they announced would remain with the team in an advisory role. At thirty years of age, he became the youngest general manager in MLB, and is one year younger than the Brewers' Ryan Braun. At his introductory press conference, Stearns endorsed Craig Counsell as the Brewers' manager.

Stearns fired five of the Brewers' seven coaches, and began to restructure the front office by reassigning Gord Ash, the assistant general manager, and Reid Nichols, the farm director within the organization, and hiring Matt Arnold from the Tampa Bay Rays as assistant general manager. During his first offseason as general manager, Stearns replaced half of the members of the Brewers' 40-man roster. His first transactions included trading Jonathan Lucroy and acquiring Travis Shaw, Eric Thames, and Anthony Swarzak.

In 2018, Stearns signed free agents Lorenzo Cain and Jhoulys Chacin, and executed the trade for Christian Yelich, who won the National League MVP in his first season as a Brewer. The Brewers were in second place in the NL Central by the MLB trade deadline, and he orchestrated moves to acquire Mike Moustakas, Curtis Granderson, Gio Gonzalez, and Jonathan Schoop. These trades bolstered the roster and put the Brewers in a position to make the playoffs. They won the division after defeating the Chicago Cubs in the 2018 National League Central tie-breaker game and beat the Colorado Rockies in the 2018 National League Division Series in three games. However, they lost to the Los Angeles Dodgers in the 2018 National League Championship Series in seven games. Yelich was named the 2018 NL MVP after the season. Stearns finished second in the MLB Executive of the Year voting, but was the highest-voted NL executive.

In January 2019, the Brewers signed Stearns to a contract extension and promoted him to president of baseball operations and general manager. After the 2020 season, the Brewers promoted Matt Arnold to general manager, with Stearns remaining president of baseball operations.

On October 27, 2022, the Brewers announced that Stearns was stepping down as president of baseball operations and moving into an advisory role with ownership. General Manager Matt Arnold would take over baseball operations duties. The move came after a disappointing Brewers season in which the club missed the playoffs for the first time in five years. On August 1, 2022, the team traded star closer Josh Hader one day before the trade deadline. At the time, Milwaukee sat in first place in the NL Central but would finish the season seven games back of the St. Louis Cardinals. After they were eliminated from playoff contention on October 3, many pointed to the Hader trade as the turning point in the season. Stearns himself hinted at regretting the move in his season-ending press conference, admitting, "It had a more pronounced impact than I thought it would at the time, and the surrounding moves didn't adequately fortify the team in Josh’s absence."

Stearns is generally considered to have presided over the most successful stretch in Brewers history, guiding the organization to four consecutive playoff appearances from 2018 - 2021, and earned the reputation as one of the most respected executives in Major League Baseball.  Following his resignation, Stearns was regularly connected to President positions with the New York Mets and Houston Astros.  Stearns remains under contract with the Brewers through the 2023 season.

Personal life
Stearns was born and raised in Manhattan. He is married to Whitney Ann Lee.

Notes

References

Harvard University alumni
People from Manhattan
American people of Jewish descent
Major League Baseball central office executives
Cleveland Indians executives
Houston Astros executives
Milwaukee Brewers executives
Major League Baseball general managers
1985 births

Living people